Chris Joseph may refer to:

 Chris Joseph (autobiographer), British writer
 Chris Joseph (ice hockey) (born 1969), retired Canadian ice hockey defenceman
 Chris Joseph (writer/artist), British/Canadian multimedia writer and artist

See also
Kris Joseph (born 1988), Canadian basketball player